The 2017 National Cup was the 25th edition of the Vietnamese Cup. It was sponsored by Sứ Thiên Thanh, and known as the Sứ Thiên Thanh National Cup for sponsorship purposes. This year's competition, which features 21 teams including V.League 1's 14 teams and National First Division's 7 teams. The winner are qualified to AFC Cup.

Round one

Round two

Quarter-finals

1st Legs

2nd Legs

Quảng Nam won 6-1 on aggregate

Sông Lam Nghệ An won 7-1 on aggregate

SHB Đà Nẵng won 4-1 on aggregate

Becamex Bình Dương won 5-3 on aggregate

Semi-finals

1st Legs

2nd Legs

Sông Lam Nghệ An won 7–4 on aggregate

Becamex Bình Dương won 5–2 on aggregate

Final

1st Legs

2nd Legs

Sông Lam Nghệ An won 7–2 on aggregate

References

External links
  Official website
 2017 Vietnamese Cup, On Soccerway

Vietnamese National Cup
2017 domestic association football cups
Cup